Coyne College was a private for-profit college in Chicago, Illinois. It was founded in 1899 and  closed in March 2022.

History
The school was established in Chicago as a branch of the Coyne Electrical School of Boston in 1899. In 1960s, the Coyne Electrical School merged with the American Institute of Engineering and Technology to become Coyne American Institute. In 2004, the school opened two new campuses, one on West Monroe and the other on North Green Street. They replaced the previous campus on West Fullerton. In 2013, the school established the Coyne American Institute Educational Foundation to assist students of Coyne College as well as students of Brown College. In June 2016, Coyne College moved to a new location in Chicago’s business district known as the Loop. It closed in March 2022.

References

External links
Official website

Educational institutions established in 1899
1899 establishments in Illinois
Universities and colleges in Chicago
For-profit universities and colleges in the United States
Private universities and colleges in Illinois
Educational institutions disestablished in 2022
2022 disestablishments in Illinois